List of assets owned by Hearst Communications, a privately held American-based media conglomerate based in the Hearst Tower in New York City, USA.:

Publishing

Newspapers
 Journal-Courier (Jacksonville, Illinois)
 The Advocate (Stamford, Connecticut)
 The New Haven Register (New Haven, Connecticut)
 Albany Times Union (Albany, New York)
 Beaumont Enterprise (Beaumont, Texas)
 Connecticut Post (Bridgeport, Connecticut)
 Edwardsville Intelligencer (Edwardsvile, Illinois)
 Greenwich Time (Greenwich, Connecticut)
 The Hour (Norwalk, Connecticut)
 Houston Chronicle  (Houston, Texas)
 Huron Daily Tribune (Bad Axe, Michigan)
 Laredo Morning Times (Laredo, Texas)
 Midland Daily News (Midland, Michigan)
 Midland Reporter-Telegram  (Midland, Texas)
 The News-Times (Danbury, Connecticut)
The Pioneer (Big Rapids, Michigan)
 Plainview Daily Herald  (Plainview, Texas)
 San Antonio Express-News (San Antonio, Texas)
 San Francisco Chronicle (San Francisco, California)
 seattlepi.com, formerly the Seattle Post-Intelligencer (Seattle, Washington)

Magazines
 Bicycling
 Car and Driver
 Cosmopolitan
 Country Living
 Dr. Oz THE GOOD LIFE
 ELLE
 ELLE DECOR
 Esquire
 Food Network Magazine
 Good Housekeeping
 Harper's BAZAAR
 HGTV Magazine
 House Beautiful
 Inside Soap
 O, The Oprah Magazine
 Popular Mechanics
 Redbook
 Road & Track
 Seventeen
 Town&Country
 VERANDA
 Prevention
 Men's Health
Woman's Day
 Women's Health

Broadcasting

Production & distribution
 Hearst Media Production Group

Radio
 WBAL-AM (Baltimore, MD)
 WIYY-FM (Baltimore, MD)

Television
WVTM-TV (Birmingham, AL)
KHBS-TV/KHOG-TV (Fort Smith, AR)
KCRA-TV & KQCA-TV (Sacramento, CA)
KSBW-TV (Salinas, CA)
WESH-TV & WKCF-TV (Orlando, FL)
WMOR-TV (Tampa, FL)
WPBF-TV (West Palm Beach, FL)
WJCL-TV (Savannah-Hilton Head Island, GA-SC)
KCCI-TV (Des Moines, IA)
WLKY-TV (Louisville, KY)
WDSU-TV (New Orleans, LA)
WMTW-TV & WPXT-TV (Portland, ME)
WBAL-TV (Baltimore, MD)
WCVB-TV (Boston, MA)
WAPT-TV (Jackson, MS)
KMBC-TV & KCWE-TV (Kansas City, MO)
KETV-TV (Omaha, NE)
WMUR-TV (Manchester, NH)
KOAT-TV (Albuquerque, NM)
WPTZ-TV/WNNE-TV (Plattsburgh-Burlington, NY-VT)
WXII-TV/WCWG-TV (Winston-Salem, NC)
WLWT-TV (Cincinnati, OH)
KOCO-TV (Oklahoma City, OK)
 WGAL-TV (Lancaster, PA)
WTAE-TV (Pittsburgh, PA)
WYFF-TV (Greenville, SC)
WISN-TV (Milwaukee, WI)

Cable
 A+E Networks (50%, with The Walt Disney Company)
A&E
 History
 FYI
 Viceland
 Military History
 Crime & Investigation Network
 Lifetime
 LMN
 Lifetime Real Women
 Cosmopolitan Television
 ESPN Inc. (20%, with The Walt Disney Company which holds 80% majority) 
 ESPN
 ESPN2
 ESPN Classic
 ESPNEWS
 ESPN Deportes
 ESPNU
 ESPN Now
 ESPN Plus
 ESPN Films
 ESPN PPV
 ESPN Regional Television (dba ESPN Events)
 ESPN International (see for complete list of channels)
 North American Sports Network
 TSN (30%)
 ESPN Radio
 Mobile ESPN
 ESPN3
 ESPN The Magazine
 ESPN Home Entertainment (currently distributed by Genius Products)
 ESPN Outdoors
 BASS
 ESPN Digital Center
 Arena Football League (undisclosed minority stake acquired December 2006)

Business media
 LocalEdge - formerly THE TALKING PHONE BOOK,
 Blackbook
 IC Master
 Electronic Engineers Master Catalog
 Electronic Products Magazine
 First DataBank
 Fitch Ratings (80%) - FIMALAC (20%)
 FleetCross
 Floor Covering Weekly
 Homecare Homebase 
 IDG/Hearst
 Local.com
MCG Health
 MHK
 Metrix4Media
 MOTOR Information Systems
 NOVA Electronik
 ODG (Work Loss Data Institute)
 Stocknet
 StructuredContent
 TL Publications
 Used Car Guides
 Zynx Health Incorporated

Interactive media
Investments include:

 XM Satellite Radio
 MetaTV
 Circles
 Mobility Technologies
 Cymfony
 drugstore.com
 Referral Networks
 Hire.com
 govWorks.com
 Genealogy.com
 Scene7
 Tavolo
 Medscape
 iVillage, Inc.
 Brandwise
 Broadcast.com
 Exodus
 E Ink Corporation
 Zip2
 I Pro
 Netscape
 Digital Spy
 UGO Networks
 RealAge
 Delish.com
 Savored
 Manilla
 Hearst Shkulev Digital

Other
 King Features Syndicate
 Reed Brennan
 CDS Global
 Hearst Holdings, Inc.
 Wyntoon
 Hearst Shkulev Media
 iCrossing, Inc.
 NorthSouth Productions (50%)
 CAMP Systems International, Inc.
 CAMP Europe S.A.S.
 CAMP Data Support and Services (DSS), Ltd.
 Inventory Locator Service, LLC
 Continuum Applied Technology
 Component Control
 AMSTAT
 KUBRA Data Transfer Ltd. (80%)

Former assets
 Light TV (joint venture with Mark Burnett, Roma Downey and MGM Television, sold to Allen Media Group and rebranded as TheGrio TV)
 Litton Entertainment (absorbed into Hearst Media Production Group)
 Litton Worldwide Distribution
 Litton Media Sales
 Litton News Source

Former media
 The American Weekly (1896-1966):   Sunday newspaper supplement (November 1, 1896, until 1966)
 The Atlanta Georgian (1912-1939)
 Baltimore News-American and predecessors (1923-1986)
 Boston Herald and predecessors (1904-1982)
 Chicago American (1900-1956)
 The Connoisseur (1901-1992)
 Detroit Times (1921-1960)
Locomotion (1996-2005)
 Los Angeles Herald Examiner and predecessors (1903-1989)
 Marie Claire (1994-2021)
 Milwaukee Sentinel and predecessors (1919-1962)
 Nash's Magazine (1910-1937)
 New York Journal-American and predecessors (1896-1966)
 New York Daily Mirror (1924-1928, 1932–1963)
 Oakland Post Enquirer (1922-1960)
 Omaha Daily Bee (1928-1937)
 Pittsburgh Sun-Telegraph (1927-1960)
 Rochester Journal-American (1922-1937)
 San Francisco Examiner (1880-2000)
 Science Digest (1937-1988)
 Sports Afield (1953-2000)
 Syracuse Herald-Journal and predecessors (1922-1939)
 The Washington Times and The Washington Herald (1917-1939)

See also
 Lists of corporate assets

References

Sources
  Columbia Journalism Review

Hearst Corporation